Syed Ghulam Moinuddin Gilani commonly known as Baray Lala jee born on Saturday, 22 May 1920 at Golra Sharif, of district Rawalpindi was the Sajjada Nashin of Shrine Golra Sharif. He was the grandson of Pir Meher Ali Shah. He was the son of Syed Ghulam Mohiyyuddin Gilani and father of Pakistani scholar Naseer-uddin-Naseer. He is also the elder brother of Syed Shah Abdul Haq Gilani.

Education
Ghulam Moinuddin received his education from Ghulam Muhammad Peshawari, the islamic leader of Golra Sharif. He had completed his recitation of the Quran in 1936. He studied Dars-e-Nizami from Muhammad Ghazi in the same institution and learned "Sharah Jami" and "Hadaya" etc. After the death of his teacher Muhammad Ghazi in 1938, Ghulam Moinuddin's father Syed Ghulam Mohiyyuddin Gilani appointed Ghulam Muhammad Ghotavi as a mentor for the religious training of his both sons. Ghulam Moinuddin and his brother studied at Jamia Abbasia Bahawalpur (now known as Islamia University) in 1938 and received the guidance of the principal of the Jamia. After learning Islamic disciplines for seven years in Bahawalpur, Ghulam received the certificate of Allama, Maulvi and Fazil. He is also said to be student of mathematics.

Life
Ghulam's father trained him with religious knowledge, ethics, spiritual education, social service, Shariah and Tariqah. After the death of his father, all responsibilities of the Golra sharif shrine were taken by Ghulam and his brother.

Sources says that he worked for implementation of the Prophet Muhammad's system of living a life. He is reported to have sent a letter to the former Prime Minister Mian Nawaz Sharif emphasizing on implementation of the system of Prophet Muhammad in Pakistan.

Literary works
"Israr-ul-Mushtaq" the poetic work of Ghulam Moinuddin was published by his brother Syed Shah Abdul Haq Gilani for the first time on 1st of Dhul Qa'dah, 1418 A.H after his demise

Death
He died on 12 March 1997. Condolences messages from the then President, Prime Minister of Pakistan, Provincial Governors, Chief Ministers and other dignitaries were published in the newspapers.. Many Religious Scholars, saints with their descendants, dignitaries, and many people shared the condolence to his brother Syed Shah Abdul Haq. His Urs is Celebrated every year on the 2nd and 3rd of  Dhu'l-Qa'dah.

See also
Meher Ali Shah
Naseeruddin Naseer Gilani
Shrine of Meher Ali Shah

References

1920 births
1997 deaths
Chishtis
Punjabi Sufis